Raghavan (born 12 December 1941) is an Indian actor who has acted in Malayalam more than 100 films including Telugu and Kannada films.  Malayalam actor Jishnu was his son. From early 2000s he is more active on Malayalam and Tamil television serials .

Early and personal life

Raghavan was born in Taliparamba in Kannur district. He attended Moothedath High School, Kozhikode Guruvayoorappan School, Madhura Gandhigram. After completing higher secondary he worked in Tagore Drama Troupe. He pursued bachelors in Rural Education from Gandhigram Rural Institute. He got his Diploma from Delhi National School of Drama. His first film was Kayalkarayil in 1968.

Filmography

As an actor
All films are in Malayalam language unless otherwise noted.

Direction

Screenplay

 TV serialsAll TV Serials are in Malayalam, unless noted.''

Awards and nominations

References

External links
All you want to know about #Raghavan(MalayalamActor)
malayalamcinema.com, Official website of AMMA, Malayalam Film news, Malayalam Movie Actors & Actress, Upcoming Malayalam movies

Raghavan at MSI

1941 births
Indian male film actors
Male actors from Kozhikode
Living people
Male actors in Malayalam cinema
20th-century Indian male actors
21st-century Indian male actors
Indian male television actors
Male actors in Malayalam television
Malayalam screenwriters
Malayalam film directors
Writers from Kozhikode
Film directors from Kerala
20th-century Indian film directors
Screenwriters from Kerala
Kerala State Television Award winners